"La Romana" is a song by Puerto Rican rapper Bad Bunny, featuring El Alfa, a Dominican dembow artist. It is the sixth single of Bad Bunny's debut studio album X 100pre. The single reached a peak position of 12 on the Billboard Hot Latin Songs chart.

Music video
The music video was released on April 6, 2019. It currently surpassed 190 million views.

Controversy
A young boy died from the burns he suffered while trying to re-enact the video clip of this song. The three kids were reportedly trying to recreate the video of Bad Bunny's song "La Romana", in which the singer and Dominican artist El Alfa sing and dance while surrounded by flames.

Charts

Weekly charts

Year-end charts

References

Bad Bunny songs
2019 songs
Music video controversies
Songs written by Bad Bunny
El Alfa songs